The following highways are numbered 285:

Brazil
 BR-285

Canada
Manitoba Provincial Road 285
 Quebec Route 285

Ireland
  R285 regional road

Japan
 Japan National Route 285

United States
 Interstate 285 (multiple highways)
 U.S. Route 285
 Alabama State Route 285
 California State Route 285 (former)
 Florida State Road 285
 Georgia State Route 285
 Iowa Highway 285 (former)
 K-285 (Kansas highway)
Kentucky Route 285
 Maryland Route 285
 Montana Secondary Highway 285
 New York State Route 285 (former)
 Ohio State Route 285
 Pennsylvania Route 285
 Tennessee State Route 285
 Texas State Highway 285
 Texas State Highway Loop 285
 Farm to Market Road 285 (Texas)
 Utah State Route 285
 Virginia State Route 285
 Washington State Route 285